Thomas Francis Jamieson (1829-1913) was a Scottish scientist most associated with his studies of sea level and glacial isostasy during the Quaternary.

Born the son of a jeweller, Jamieson was raised in Aberdeen and educated at Aberdeen Grammar School and the University of Aberdeen, at which he was appointed Fordyce Lecturer in Agriculture in 1862, a post he held for 15 years. He was later employed as the factor managing the estate lands of Ellon Castle in Aberdeenshire.

Interested in geology from an early age, Jamieson corresponded widely with other scientists, including Charles Lyell and Charles Darwin.  After early research on petrology, Jamieson studied the glaciated rocks of Scotland, providing evidence for the then-fledgling theory of ice ages.  Later work on marine sediments found above sea level in the Forth Valley convinced Jamieson that the area had once been beneath sea level, and that this was caused by the weight of glaciers depressing the land.

While these views brought Jamieson into conflict with the prevailing orthodoxy of the Geological Survey of Scotland (now the British Geological Survey), he continued to elaborate them, identifying raised shorelines around Scotland at a series of elevations (7.6, 15.0 or 30.5 metres).  Despite these efforts, and his election to the Geological Society of London in 1862, his views on the geological history of Scotland only gained full acceptance in the late 20th century.

See also
 Post-glacial rebound
 Glen Roy

References

External links
 Thomas Francis Jamieson biography, Gazetteer for Scotland
 Thomas Francis Jamieson entry, Darwin Correspondence Project

1829 births
1913 deaths
People from Aberdeen
People educated at Aberdeen Grammar School
Scottish geologists
Alumni of the University of Aberdeen
Scottish agronomists
Academics of the University of Aberdeen
Scottish chemists
Recipients of orders, decorations, and medals of Sudan